Marriage Lines is a 1962 Australian television play directed by Christopher Muir.

Plot
Lysette returns to London after three unsuccessful marriages to look up her cousin Virgilia who is married to publisher Felix. Felix runs a business that used to belong to Virgilia's father. Lysette begins an affair with Felix. Robbie Lambert is upset Felix wants to sell his theatre.

Cast
Walter Sullivan as Felix Pilgrim
Patricia Kennedy as Virgilia Pilgrim
Mary Ward as Lysette Eggerton
Moira Carleton as Chrissie, the Piglrims' maid
Beverley Dunn as Peggy, Felix's secretary
Joy Mitchell as Daphne
Campbell Copelin as Robbie Lambert
Vernon Yorke as American
Kurt Ludescher and Ray Angel as waiters
Roland Heimans as office boy

Production
The play had been filmed by the BBC in 1961. It was an original for television. The play had been performed on Australian radio in 1961.

In discussing why the ABC chose it for production, Filmink magazine hypothesized that "the ABC were attracted by Dane’s reputation... The BBC stamp of approval would have helped."

Walter Sullivan travelled to Melbourne to shoot the production. It was Beverly Dunn's first TV play since she returned to Australia. Kennedy appeared by courtesy of Emerald Hill Theatre in Melbourne. Cas Van Puflen designed it.

Reception
The Australian Women's Weekly TV critic called the production "a half-and-half job. Christopher Muir's production was satisfyingly polished; the play itself was woeful. The ABC decided to advertise this offering as a "sophisticated comedy." The theme—one woman trying to snaffle another's husband— can be funny, I suppose. But "Marriage Lines" was a melodrama of mothball manners... the cast had to battle with curiously dated dialogue... [a] sheer waste of good production and a goodish cast. "Marriage Lines" should have been murdered. Preferably at the dress rehearsal, if not before."

References

External links
Marriage Lines at National Film and Sound Archive
Marriage Lines at IMDb

Australian television plays
1962 television plays